Ophlitaspongia is a genus of demosponges belonging to the family Microcionidae. Many species formerly included in this genus have been moved to other genera such as Clathria and Echinoclathria and the genus currently contains only two recognized species.

Species
Ophlitaspongia kildensis
Ophlitaspongia papilla

References
Ophlitaspongia at World Register of Marine Species

Poecilosclerida
Taxa named by James Scott Bowerbank